Michigan City, formerly known as Davis Mills, is an unincorporated community in Benton County, Mississippi, United States. Although unincorporated, Michigan City has a post office, with the ZIP code of 38647.

Geography

It is located along Mississippi Highway 7 in north central Benton County, just south of the Tennessee state line, approximately three miles north of U. S. Route 72.

Mississippi Highway 702 is called Main Street in Michigan City.

The nearly abandoned Mississippi Central Railroad, which is used only rarely for freight traffic, runs through Michigan City.

History
The majority of the first settlers being natives of the state of Michigan caused the name to be selected. Michigan City was formerly home to a flour mill and lumber mill.

A post office operated under the name Davis Mills from 1871 to 1875 and first began operation under the name Michigan City in 1875.

Davis' Mills Battle Site, a Civil War battlefield listed on the National Register of Historic Places, is located in Michigan City.

References

External links
 ZIP code demographic data

Unincorporated communities in Benton County, Mississippi
Unincorporated communities in Mississippi
Mississippi placenames of Native American origin